The name Vicente has been used for one tropical cyclone in the Eastern Pacific Ocean and for two in the Western Pacific Ocean.

In the Eastern Pacific:
 Tropical Storm Vicente (2018) – Formed south of Guatemala and moved towards southwestern Mexico.

In the Western Pacific Ocean, it was submitted by the United States.
 Tropical Storm Vicente (2005) (T0516, 16W) – Caused severe flooding in Vietnam and Thailand.
 Typhoon Vicente (2012) (T1208, 09W, Ferdie) – Affected the Philippines, Hong Kong, Macau and Guangdong, China.

The name  Vicente was retired from use in the Western Pacific after the 2012 season and replaced with Lan.

Pacific hurricane set index articles
Pacific typhoon set index articles